Terence Stoddart (28 November 1931 – October 2014) is an English former footballer who played as a wing half in the Football League for Darlington and York City. He was also on the books of Newcastle United without playing for their first team.

Stoddart was born in Newcastle upon Tyne. He represented Northumberland at youth level, and began his club career in Newcastle United's nursery team. He played for the club's reserve team for several years, but never for the first team, and in May 1954 he moved on to Third Division North club Darlington. He played only infrequently over two seasons, then spent a season with divisional rivals York City, again playing rarely, before moving into non-league football with Poole Town.

References

1931 births
2014 deaths
Footballers from Newcastle upon Tyne
English footballers
England youth international footballers
Association football midfielders
Newcastle United F.C. players
Darlington F.C. players
York City F.C. players
Poole Town F.C. players
English Football League players